Savages may refer to:

Films 
 Savages (1972 film), by James Ivory
 Savages (1974 film), an American TV film
 The Savages (film), a 2007 film by Tamara Jenkins
 Savages (2012 film), by Oliver Stone

Television 
 The Savages (TV series), a British sitcom that aired in 2001
 The Savages (Doctor Who), a 1966 serial in Doctor Who
 "Savages" (Law & Order), an episode of Law & Order

Music  
 The Savages (band), a British rock band, formed 1960, backing band for Screaming Lord Sutch
 The Savages (Bermuda band), an American garage rock band active in the mid-1960s
 Savages (band), a British post-punk band formed in 2011
 Savages (The Webb Sisters album), 2011
 Savages (Soulfly album), 2013
 Savages (Breathe Carolina album), 2014
 Savages (Glamour of the Kill album)
 Savages (Theory of a Deadman album), 2014
Savages (Theory of a Deadman song), from the album of the same name
 "Savages" (Pocahontas song), song from 1995 film Pocohontas
 "Savages", a song by Marina and the Diamonds from Froot

Other uses 
 Savages (novel), a 2010 novel by Don Winslow
 Les Sauvages ("The Savages"), Act IV of Jean-Philippe Rameau's opéra-ballet Les Indes galantes
 Savages (play), a 1973 play by Christopher Hampton
 Savages (company), a builder of Airco DH.6 airplanes during World War I

See also
 Savage (disambiguation)
 Barrence Whitfield & the Savages, a Boston-area R&B band